Al Wesal TV is a Saudi-based Sunni Islamic educational channel television network. The production of this channel is based on the teachings of Quran-o-Sunnah. A team of Islamic scholars monitors the material presented on its programs. Each program of Wesal Urdu TV is previewed according to authentic references of Quran-o-Hadees. In 2015, it launched its Urdu language TV channel.

Controversy
The channel is a topic of controversy. It was accused of preaching Salafism and spreading anti-Shia rhetoric throughout the network. In 2014, a channel's host praised suicide bombing that killed at least 47 Houthis, prompting Saudi Arabia's Culture and Information Minister to announce the closure of the channel.

External links
 Website in Arabic
 Facebook page in Arabic
 Website in Urdu
 Facebook Page in urdu
 Youtube Account in Urdu

References

Urdu-language television channels